Rhenium oxide may refer to:
 Rhenium(IV) oxide, ReO2
 Rhenium trioxide, ReO3
 Rhenium(VII) oxide, Re2O7